Cyperus cunninghamii is a sedge of the family Cyperaceae that is native to  Australia.

It blooms between March and August producing yellow-brown flowers.

It is found on rocky hills, amongst quartzite outcrops, on ledges and in gullies in the Kimberley region of Western Australia where it grows in stony red sand-clay soils. It is also found in the Northern Territory, Queensland and South Australia.

See also
List of Cyperus species

References

Plants described in 1930
Flora of Western Australia
cunninghamii
Taxa named by Charles Gardner
Flora of the Northern Territory
Flora of South Australia
Flora of Queensland